Sea pickle is a common name for several plants and animals and may refer to:

Plants
Salicornia species, especially:
Salicornia europaea, native to Europe
Salicornia virginica, native to North America
Sesuvium portulacastrum

Animals
Pyrosome, cone-shaped colonies that inhabit the upper layers of the open ocean

See also
Samphire
Pickle (disambiguation)
Sea (disambiguation)
Sea cucumber